Shree Narasimha Saraswati Swami Or Shree Nrusimha Saraswati Swami (श्रीनृसिंह सरस्वती)(1378−1459)  was an Indian guru of Dattatreya tradition(sampradaya). According to the Shri GuruCharitra, he is the second avatar of Dattatreya in Kali Yuga after Sripada Sri Vallabha.

Life
Shri Narasimha Saraswati (birth name - Shaligramadeva or Narhari)  lived from 1378 to 1459 (Shaka 1300 to Shaka 1380). Saraswati was born into a Deshastha Brahmin family in Karanjapura, modern-day Lad-Karanja (Karanja) in the Washim district, which is a part of Vidarbha region of Maharashtra, India. His father (Madhava) and his mother (Amba-Bhavani) initially named him Narahari or Shaligramadeva, with the surname Kale.

Shri Narasimha Sarswati is considered to be the second incarnation of Dattatreya, the first Incarnation was Sripada Srivallabha, as per his blessings to Amba Bhavani, in her previous birth, Sripada Srivallabha had blessed her & he advised her to perform shiva pooja. Later he also told that he would be born to her in her next life as Narasimha Saraswathi to uphold the Sanatha Dharma in Kali Yuga. This instance has been well narrated from chapter 5 to Chapter 12 in the holy book Guru Charithra
Shri Narasimha Saraswati/ Narhari was a quiet child, only speaks Aum (Om  Hinduism sacred word)  since their birth. This led his parents to worry about his speech ability; however, Narahari showed through hand gestures that after his upanayana or munji (sacred thread ceremony), he would be able to speak. He started reciting the Vedas after his munja, which so impressed the Brahmins in the village that it was talked about, with senior learned Brahmins coming to him for learning.

Shri Narasimha Saraswati left home in 1386 at a tender age of 7 all alone and went on a pilgrimage to Kashi on foot. He took Sanyasa at Kashi from Old Sage Shri Krishna Saraswati. The second part of his name came from this guru, who eventually named him Shri Narasimha Saraswati. (This is a Sanskrit name.)

After becoming a Sanyasi, Narasimha Saraswati visited several holy places (tirtha) before returning to Karanja at the age 30 to meet his parents. He visited various places and stayed before settling in Ganagapura (Ganagapur) (now in the state of Karnataka) for the last 20 years of his life.

Towards the end of his life, Shri Narasimha Saraswati met with the Muslim king (Sultan) of Bidar, possibly 'Ala-ud-Din Ahmed Shah' of the Bahmani Sultanate, who was ruling the area at that time.

Since his karma for that avatar had completed, thus he decided to take samadhi. He left for
the forest of Kardali (Kardali vana near Srisailam). Saraswati took Nijanandagamana (निजानंदगमन) type of samadhi in 1459 for 300 years.

Chronology
The main events of Sri Narasimha Saraswati's life are given below. Possible years and dates are given according to descriptions of the lunar and stellar events calendar mentioned in the Shri GuruCharitra.

Sha. 1300 (1378 CE): Birth Karanja, Washim district, Vidarbha region, Maharashtra
Sha. 1307 (1385 CE): Upanayan
Sha. 1308 (1386 CE): Left home
Sha. 1310 (1388 CE): Took Sanyas
Sha. 1338 (1416 CE): Arrived back home at Karanja
Sha. 1340 (1418 CE): Travelled along the banks of the river Gautami
Sha. 1342 (1420 CE): Stayed at Parali-Vaijanath, Beed district, Maharashtra
Sha. 1343 (1421 CE): Stayed at Audumbar (near Bhilavadi), Sangli district, Maharashtra
Sha. 1344-1356 (1422-1434 CE): Stayed at Narasoba Wadi (Narasimhapur), Kolhapur district, Maharashtra
Sha. 1357-1380 (1435-1458 CE): Stayed for 23 years at Ganagapur, Kalaburagi district, Karnataka
Sha. 1380 (28 January 1459 CE): Nijanandagamana in Kardali Vana at Srisailam, Kurnool district, Andhra Pradesh

Teachings
Before leaving home at the very tender age of eight, Narhari told his mother Ambika why he chose a life of renunciation.  

The following quote sums up very well the purpose of human life according to his teachings:

“Life is like a bubble. Death knocks at any time and can take us away. Every moment of human life is precious and a God-gifted opportunity for man to be spiritually reborn and accelerated towards the blissful state of self-realization. In earlier eras, man's life span was long.  

All is well when the scriptures (sermons, rule book or handbook) dictate life stages.  However, in the Kali Yuga, men have a shorter lifespan and do not have the longevity of the earlier Yuga.  

If one goes through life slowly, without pursuing the higher purposes of life, and if life is short, then is this birth not in vain?

Vairagya towards worldly pleasures should be cultivated from the very beginning of life. A person's energy should not be wasted on human deception. The world is illusory. 

If one does not discriminate and cultivate dispassion, one sinks into the mire of samsara and allows precious life to go to waste. 

A man should set his mind on the goal of life and strive to achieve it from the very beginning of life, because who knows when death will overtake him.  To lose one's life without realizing God is the greatest tragedy of man."

Other Teachings -

Shree Narshimha Saraswati taught that the life of Brahmins was fully covered by the rules given in the old scriptures and the rules were to be strictly followed by the Brahmins in their daily lives in order to achieve happiness and, ultimately, moksha. He insisted that his disciples follow these routines.

Biography
Many parts of Saraswati's life are told in the Shri GuruCharitra, written by Saraswati Gangadhar.

Traditions

Guru Tradition
Saraswati comes from the tradition of Sringeri Math. Jagadguru Shri Adi Shankaracharya established this Math. The guru-lineage according to Sri Guru Charitra follows like this:Pitamaha Brahmadev - Shankar - Vishnu - Bramha - Vasishtha - Shakti - Parashar - Vyas - Shuka - Gaudpadacharya - Govindacharya - Sri Adi Shankaracharya - Vishwarupacharya - Dnyanagiri - Sidhagiri - Ishwaratirtha - Narasimhatirtha - Vidyatirtha - Shivtirtha - Bharati - Vidyaranya - Vidyatirtha Saraswati - Malayananda Saraswati - Devatirtha Saraswati - Yadavendra Saraswati - Krishna Saraswati - Narasimha Saraswati.

Disciple Tradition
Shri Narasimha Saraswati had several disciples. They include:
 Shri Madhava Saraswati from Prayag
 Bal-Saraswati
 Krishna Saraswati
 Upendra Saraswati
 Sadananda Saraswati
 Dnyanajyoti Saraswati
 Siddha Saraswati
 Ramkrushna Saraswati

Siddha Saraswati is possibly the original writer of the Sanskrit GuruCharitra, which was later translated to Marathi  by Shri Saraswati Gangadhar.

Legacy
Saraswati's house where he was born is located in Karanja Lad. Although the house is no longer in the original shape, some parts remain and have been converted into a temple.

Final disciple tradition
Saraswati's final disciple tradition is as follows:

Shri Narasimha Saraswati - Madhavendra Saraswati - Amritendra Saraswati (Amritananda) - Gaganendra Saraswati - Madhavendra Saraswati (Madhava Saraswati).

After Madhava Saraswati, the tradition split into two branches:

Eknath  - Shrikrishna - Bramhadas
Vitthal Saraswati - Ambika Saraswati - Amrit

References

External links
Detailed information along with pictures
http://saibharadwaja.org/books/srigurucharitra/readbook.aspx?book=43&chapter=0

1378 births
1459 deaths
Medieval Hindu religious leaders
15th-century Indian people